Merton and Morden was a parliamentary constituency in what was then the Merton and Morden Urban District, but is now part of the London Borough of Merton.  It returned one Member of Parliament (MP) to the House of Commons of the Parliament of the United Kingdom, elected by the first past the post system.

History

The constituency was created for the 1950 general election from part of the Wimbledon constituency, and abolished for the February 1974 general election. It was replaced by the Mitcham and Morden constituency.

Boundaries 
The Urban District of Merton and Morden.

Members of Parliament

Election results

References 

Notes

Parliamentary constituencies in London (historic)
Constituencies of the Parliament of the United Kingdom established in 1950
Constituencies of the Parliament of the United Kingdom disestablished in 1974
Politics of the London Borough of Merton
Morden